F1 2020 is the official video game of the 2020 Formula 1 and Formula 2 Championships developed and published by Codemasters. It is the thirteenth title in the Formula 1 series developed by the studio and was released on 7 July for pre-orders of the Michael Schumacher Edition and 10 July for the Seventy Edition on Microsoft Windows, PlayStation 4, Xbox One and, for the first time, Stadia. The game is the twelfth main series installment in the franchise, and it features the twenty-two circuits, twenty drivers and ten teams proposed in the provisional 2020 Formula 1 World Championship.

F1 2020 features the championship as it was originally intended to be run before the championship was disrupted by the COVID-19 pandemic, which saw several races postponed or cancelled, with races at other circuits held.

This was the final F1 game before EA bought Codemasters in February 2021.

Features
The Circuit Zandvoort and the Hanoi Street Circuit — circuits which were new to the championship in 2020 — are included in the game despite the cancellations of the Dutch and Vietnamese Grands Prix. The 70th Anniversary, Eifel, Emilia Romagna, Portuguese, Sakhir, Styrian, Turkish and Tuscan Grands Prix, eight events that were added to the 2020 calendar, are not featured as well as the Nürburgring, the Imola Circuit, the Portimão Circuit, the Bahrain International Circuit "Outer Circuit" layout, the Istanbul Park and the Mugello Circuit, as they use circuits that host other events.

F1 2020 introduces a team management feature known as "My Team" which allows the player to create, own, and run an eleventh team. The player will initially need to choose an engine supplier, recruit a second driver, design a livery and sign sponsors. As the career mode progresses, they will be able to upgrade the facilities at their team's headquarters and hire staff to continue development. This supplements the development tree used to upgrade the car. Codemasters had previously used the My Team mode in Dirt 4, a part of the Dirt Rally franchise.

In career mode players now have the choice to do a half, or a full Formula 2 season or only do three races as in F1 2019, known as the F2 Feeder Series, although there is no longer a rivalry story-line and no fictional drivers other than that created by the player. When playing in Formula 1, players can choose between three different season lengths of ten, sixteen or twenty-two races. They are also able to create a custom calendar should they choose a shorter season length. The driver's "acclaim" or experience level determine their virtual pay; even though this virtual money is not used in the career mode.

F1 2020 reintroduced the Split Screen mode, which was featured in F1 2014 but was removed for the next games.

For the first time in the F1 game series, the option to use a virtual rear-view mirror has been added. If the player uses the cockpit camera view, they can have the option to use that mirror to see what's going on behind them like a road car.

In F1 2020, the AI are more prone to making mistakes to give the players "a much more realistic experience".

The game introduces driver ratings for the first time, with drivers given a score out of ninety-nine for experience, racecraft, awareness and pace. The experience score provides additional 'resource points' to enable the player to upgrade their car faster in the "My Team" and "Career" modes, racecraft relates to the effectiveness of the driver's attempts at overtaking, a higher awareness score improves the ability of the driver to maintain control of their car in difficult situations and pace relates to the driver's ability to set quick lap times. The scores are derived from real life data and applies to F2 drivers as well as those from F1.

Podium Pass is new to F1 2020 and allows players to unlock cosmetic items, such as liveries, race suits and celebration animations, all of which are new to the F1 games. A VIP Podium Pass can also be purchased using in-game Pitcoins, which also includes more exclusive liveries, race suits and celebration animations. Each game in the F1 series, starting with F1 2020 will have six series, with the sixth and final series having no time limit.

At launch, the  Formula 2 season is included; French driver Anthoine Hubert, who lost his life in the feature race at the 2019 Spa-Francorchamps Formula 2 round is also remembered within the game, as a selectable driver in "My Team". The additions of Hubert and Juan Manuel Correa, who was also involved in the incident that would cost Hubert his life, were a "tough decision"; the developers consulted all people relating to both drivers, which would reach a mutual agreement. When the player selects Hubert, a small dedication to him wlll appear. Codemasters released an update in December in which recreates the 2020 Formula 2 Championship, with Mick Schumacher becoming champion.

There are 16 classic cars available to use, the oldest being the 1988 McLaren MP4/4 and the newest being the 2010 McLaren MP4-25, Ferrari F10 and Red Bull RB6. Four cars — 1991 Jordan 191, 1994 Benetton B194, 1995 Benetton B195 and 2000 Ferrari F1-2000 — are available to those who purchased the Deluxe Schumacher Edition of the game, or those who purchased the regular edition of the game and later purchased downloadable content.

Reception

F1 2020 was released to highly positive reviews. The title received "generally favorable" reviews for PC and PlayStation 4 and "universal acclaim" for Xbox One, according to review aggregator Metacritic, thus making it the highest-rated Codemasters-developed F1 title on the site. Critics praised the new "My Team" mode, the addition of a Formula 2 mode, split-screen racing, accessibility for newcomers, and the racing itself,

The game reached number one in the United Kingdom sales charts, displacing The Last of Us Part II which fell to third place. In Japan, the PlayStation 4 version sold 5,762 copies within its first week of release, making it the fourteenth bestselling retail game of the week in the country.

It was nominated for the category of Best Sports/Racing game at The Game Awards 2020.

References

External links
 

2020 video games
Codemasters games
Ego (game engine) games
Split-screen multiplayer games
Esports games
F1 (video game series)
PlayStation 4 games
Racing video games
Stadia games
Video games set in Australia
Video games set in Austria
Video games set in Azerbaijan
Video games set in Bahrain
Video games set in Belgium
Video games set in Brazil
Video games set in Canada
Video games set in China
Video games set in France
Video games set in Hungary
Video games set in Italy
Video games set in Japan
Video games set in Mexico
Video games set in Monaco
Video games set in the Netherlands
Video games set in Russia
Video games set in Singapore
Video games set in Spain
Video games set in Texas
Video games set in the United Arab Emirates
Video games set in the United Kingdom
Video games set in Vietnam
Windows games
Xbox One games
PlayStation 4 Pro enhanced games
Multiplayer and single-player video games
Video games developed in the United Kingdom